Alfredo Segundo Olivos Araya (28 May 1924 – 31 July 1983) was a Chilean footballer. He played in one match for the Chile national football team, coming on as a substitute during a 3–2 loss to Brazil in the 1953 South American Championship.

References

External links
 
 

1924 births
1983 deaths
Chilean footballers
Chile international footballers
Association football defenders
Audax Italiano footballers
People from Tarapacá Region